The French revolutionary government granted citizenship and freedom to free people of color in May 1791, but white planters in Saint-Domingue refused to comply with this decision. This was the catalyst for the 1791 slave rebellion, a key event for the Haitian Revolution with which the new citizens demanded their granted rights.

Background

Arawak and Taino people inhabited for more than one thousand years what was later known as Hispaniola. Christopher Columbus arrived to the island on December 5, 1492.

In 1659, half of the Caribbean island of Hispaniola, became the French colony Saint-Domingue, during the time of the Atlantic slave trade

Early attempts were made by slaves in order to recover their freedom, among them can be named the uprising in Saint-Domingue made by Padrejean in 1676, and the uprising of François Mackandal in 1757

France thought the Declaration of the Rights of Man of 1789, they began to see that slavery would need to be abolished.  within two months isolated fighting broke out between the former slaves and the whites. This added to the tense climate between slaves and grands blancs. The revolt began on 22 August 1791, and ended in 1804.

Declaration of the Rights of Man and of the Citizen
In 1789, the Declaration of the Rights of Man and of the Citizen set by France's National Constituent Assembly in 1789, it is a human civil rights document from the French Revolution. Inspired by Enlightenment philosophers, the Declaration was a core statement of the values of the French Revolution and had a major impact on the development of popular conceptions of individual liberty and democracy in Europe and worldwide. The Declaration was originally drafted by the Marquis de Lafayette, in consultation with Thomas Jefferson. Influenced by the doctrine of "natural right", the rights of man are held to be universal: valid at all times and in every place. It became the basis for a nation of free individuals protected equally by the law.

Ceremony at the Bois Caïman

On the night of August 14, 1791, representative slaves from nearby plantations of Le Cap gathered to participate in a secret ceremony conducted in the woods in the French colony of Saint-Domingue.

During the ceremony Dutty Boukman and priestess Cécile Fatiman prophesied that Georges Biassou, Jeannot, Jean-François Papillon would lead the revolution.

Rebellion

Jean-François Papillon was born in Africa but was enslaved and taken in captivity to the North Province of Saint-Domingue, where he worked in the plantation of Papillon in the last decades of the 18th Century. He escaped from that plantation and became a maroon, when the revolution started in August 1791 had a second experience of freedom and led the initial uprising of enslaved workers and later allied with Spain against the French.

One week after the ceremony, 1800 plantations had been destroyed and killed the owners and slaveholders to whom they were enslaved.

Thomas Madiou's Histoire d’Haïti (English: History of Haiti) emphasises that within the first months of fighting, Georges and Jean-François became the most important insurgent leaders. Biassou commanded approximately 40,000 slaves to burn plantations and murder the "great whites". Georges and Jean proposed peace negotiations with France, offering to cease the revolt in exchange for emancipation. France was preoccupied, being at war with several monarchies and kingdoms, and hence dismissed this proposal. Concurrently, Georges and Jean developed informal contacts with Spain, which controlled Santo Domingo.

Jeannot Bullet launched vicious attacks on whites and mulattoes, devising gruesome methods of putting them to death. Toussaint Louverture was sickened by his attitudes and actions. (Beard, p. 55)

See also 

 Slavery in Haiti
 Haitian Revolution
 Independence of Haiti
 Armée Indigène
 End of slavery in Haiti

References

1791 in Haiti
Conflicts in 1791
History of Hispaniola
Haitian Revolution
Slave rebellions in North America